This is a list of law enforcement agencies in the state of New Mexico.

According to the US Bureau of Justice Statistics' 2008 Census of State and Local Law Enforcement Agencies, the state had 146 law enforcement agencies employing 5,010 sworn police officers, about 252 for each 100,000 residents. This is almost exactly the national average of policemen to residents in the United States.

State agencies 
 New Mexico Department of Public Safety
 New Mexico State Police
 New Mexico Mounted Patrol
 New Mexico Attorney General's Office 
 New Mexico Board of Pharmacy 
 New Mexico Corrections Department
 New Mexico Department of Game and Fish 
 New Mexico Energy, Minerals and Natural Resources Department
 New Mexico State Forestry Division
 Special Agents
 New Mexico State Parks Division
 Park Rangers
 New Mexico Livestock Inspector Board 
 New Mexico Taxation and Revenue Department 
 Office of the Inspector General
 Tax Fraud Investigations Division

County agencies 

Bernalillo County Sheriff's Department
Catron County Sheriff's Department 
Chaves County Sheriff’s Office
Cibola County Sheriff's Office
Colfax County Sheriff's Office
Curry County Sheriff's Office
De Baca County Sheriff's Office
Doña Ana County Sheriff's Office
Eddy County Sheriff's Office
Grant County Sheriff's Department
Guadalupe County Sheriff's Office

Harding County Sheriff's Department
Hidalgo County Sheriff's Department
Lea County Sheriff's Department
Lincoln County Sheriff's Office
Los Alamos County Police Department
Luna County Sheriff's Office
McKinley County Sheriff's Office
Mora County Sheriff's Office
Otero County Sheriff's Department
Quay County Sheriff's Office
Rio Arriba County Sheriff's Office

Roosevelt County Sheriff's Office
San Juan County Sheriff's Office
San Miguel County Sheriff's Office
Sandoval County Sheriff's Office
Santa Fe County Sheriff's Office
Sierra County Sheriff's Office
Socorro County Sheriff's Department
Taos County Sheriff's Department
Torrance County Sheriff's Department
Union County Sheriff's Office
Valencia County Sheriff's Office

City agencies 

Alamogordo Police Department
Albuquerque Police Department
Angel Fire Police Department
Anthony Police Department 
Artesia Police Department
Aztec Police Department
Bayard Police Department
Belen Police Department
Bernalillo Police Department
Bloomfield Police Department
Bosque Farms Police Department
Buena Vista Police Department
Capitan Police Department
Carlsbad Police Department
Carrizozo Police Department
Cerrillos Police Department
Chama Police Department
Clayton Police Department
Cloudcroft Police Department
Clovis Police Department
Corrales Police Department
Cuba Police Department

Deming Police Department
Edgewood Police Department
Española Police Department
Estancia Police Department
Farmington Police Department
Gallup Police Department
Grants Police Department
Hatch Police Department
Hobbs Police Department
Hurley Police Department
Jemez Springs Police Department
Lamy Police Department
Las Cruces Police Department
Las Vegas Police Department
Lordsburg Police Department
Los Alamos Police Department
Los Lunas Police Department
Loving Police Department
Lovington Police Department
Magdalena Police Department
Mesilla Marshal's Department
Mora Police Department

Moriarty Police Department
Mountainair Police Department
Placitas Police Department
Portales Police Department
Raton Police Department
Red River Marshal's Office
Rio Rancho Police Department
Roswell Police Department
Ruidoso Police Department
San Ysidro Marshal's Office
Sandia Park Police Department
Santa Fe Police Department
Santa Clara Police Department
Silver City Police Department
Socorro Police Department
Sunland Park Police Department
Taos Police Department
Tijeras Police Department
Truth Or Consequences Police Department
Tucumcari Police Department
Vaughn Police Department

Tribal agencies 

Acoma Pueblo Police Department
Cochiti Pueblo Police Department
Isleta Pueblo Police Department
Jemez Pueblo Police Department
Jicarilla Apache Police Department
Laguna Pueblo Police Department
Mescalero Apache Police Department
Nambe Pueblo Police Department
Navajo Nation Department of Law Enforcement
Chinle Police District
Crownpoint Police District
Dilcon Police District
Kayenta Police District
Shiprock Police District
Tuba City Police District

Picuris Pueblo Police Department
Pojoaque Pueblo Police Department
Ramah Navaho Chapter Police Department
Sandia Tribal Police
San Felipe Pueblo Police Department
San Ildefonso Pueblo Police Department
San Juan Pueblo Police Department
Santa Ana Pueblo Police Department
Santa Clara Pueblo Police Department
Santo Domingo Pueblo Police Department
Taos Pueblo Police Department
Tesuque Pueblo Police Department
Zia Pueblo Police Department
Zuni Pueblo Police Department

College and university agencies 

Eastern New Mexico University Police Department
New Mexico Highlands University Police Department
New Mexico Institute of Mining and Technology Police Department
New Mexico Military Institute Police Department

New Mexico State University Police Department
University of New Mexico Police Department
Western New Mexico University Police Department

Other agencies 

Burlington Northern Santa Fe Railway Police
Bureau of Indian Affairs Police

Albuquerque Public Schools Police

Office of the United States Marshal for the District of New Mexico

References

New Mexico
Law enforcement agencies of New Mexico
Law enforcement agencies